Cassina Point (also known as the Hopkinson House and Cassina Point Plantation) was built in 1847 for Carolina Lafayette Seabrook and her husband, James Hopkinson. Carolina Seabrook was the daughter of wealthy Edisto Island planter William Seabrook. William Seabrook had hosted the General Lafayette in 1825 at his nearby home at the time of Carolina's birth. Seabrook gave Lafayette the honor of naming the newborn child, and the general selected Carolina (for the girl's birthplace) and Lafayette (after his own name). When Carolina Seabrook married James Hopkinson, they built Cassina Point on the land given to them by William Seabrook.

The house is a large antebellum house and remnant of a sea island cotton plantation. James Hopkinson was a grandson of Francis Hopkinson, a signer of the Declaration of Independence from New Jersey and designer of the American flag. During the Civil War, the house was occupied by the Third New Hampshire Volunteer Infantry.

Features of the -story, rectangular house include a side-gable roof, pediments, a Flemish-bond basement, brick chimneys with stuccoed necking, a roof porch supported by columns, marble mantles, and bull's-eye moulding. The interior of the house was preserved well over the years. The exterior is clad in weatherboard and flushboard. Cassina Point was added to the National Register of Historic Places on November 28, 1986.

References

External links

Official Website

Historic American Buildings Survey in South Carolina
National Register of Historic Places in Charleston County, South Carolina
Houses on the National Register of Historic Places in South Carolina
Houses in Charleston County, South Carolina